The DeSoto Fireflite is a full-size premium automobile which was produced by DeSoto in the United States from 1955 until 1960.

Design
The Fireflite was introduced in 1955 as De Soto's top trim package of the DeSoto Firedome. It was wider and longer than the Firedome and it came equipped with a 325 cubic inch displacement (5.3L) V8 engine producing 200 hp when equipped with the 4 barrel carburetor (190 kW) and PowerFlite automatic transmission. The transmission was operated by a Flite-Control lever located on the dashboard. The car weighed 4,070 lb (1850 kg) and cost US$3,544 ($ in  dollars ). AM radio was a $110 option ($ in  dollars ).

The 1956 model car was best known for its long, tapering tail fins, often accentuated by a two-tone exterior finish. The interior offered bench seating that could accommodate six passengers. The Fireflite had a 0 to 60 mph (97 km/h) acceleration time of 11 seconds and a top speed of 110 mph (175 km/h).

Sales

The Fireflite’s bold design increased sales for DeSoto. In 1955, DeSotos sold well with over 114,765 examples produced, making 1955 the best year for the company since 1946. By 1956, DeSoto placed eleventh in U.S. production with an annual production of 110,418 cars. The success was short-lived, however, and Chrysler Corporation discontinued the Fireflite models at the end of the 1960 model year,  and the DeSoto brand effective in November 1960.

Indianapolis 500 pace car

In 1956 a gold and white Fireflite convertible was the Official Pace Car for the 1956 Indianapolis 500. While no official production figures for the pacesetter convertibles was ever released, research from National DeSoto Club members has narrowed it down to between 390-426 produced. Indianapolis 500 President Tony Hulman said the DeSoto was chosen unanimously by the track committee because it delivered outstanding performance and had superb handling characteristics.

Modifications and specifications

The 1956 Fireflite had a longer stroke, 3.80 inches, giving a 330 cubic inch displacement (5.4L). It made up 27.39% of DeSoto's sales in 1956. Power seats were $70, while power brakes cost $40.

The Fireflite’s appearance for 1957 was redesigned with the help of Chrysler Corporation's head stylist, Virgil Exner. The design was bold and radical with large tail fins, dual oval exhaust and triple-lens taillights. The tail fins were not only aesthetic, but helped to stabilize the car at high speeds.

A four-headlight system was optional for both the Fireflite and DeSoto Firedome models in 1957. The DeSoto Firesweep polyhead V8s were introduced  with a bore and stroke of  X  . for 325 cid. The two barrel V8 was rated at  while the four barrel version produced .

The 330 cid hemi engine was replaced by a hemi which was 341 cid (5.6L) . Both engines had a 9.25:1 compression ratio.

In 1957 the Fireflite was superseded by the Adventurer as the premium DeSoto model. Nevertheless, Fireflites continued to offer high-grade appointments in a full line of body styles. Also in 1957, a station wagon was added to the Fireflite's lineup. Back-up lights became standard.

In 1958, a new engine was added.

For 1959, the car was restyled. The electric clock became standard. A hand brake light was optional.

References

Fireflite
Cars introduced in 1955
1960s cars